PC or pc may refer to:

Arts and entertainment

 Player character or playable character, a fictional character controlled by a human player, usually in role-playing games or computer games
 Port Charles, an American daytime TV soap opera
 Production code number, a designation used to identify television episodes
 Pretty Cure, a Japanese anime franchise

Business and finance

 Percentage (pc), numeric ratio signifier
 Prime cost or variable cost
 Principal Consultant, a management consulting position
 Professional corporation, a type of corporate entity for licensed professionals (attorneys, architects, physicians, engineers, etc.)

Organizations

Businesses
 Pearl-Continental Hotels & Resorts, a hotel chain in Pakistan
 Pirelli & C. (stock symbol: PC)
 President's Choice, a private label product brand of the Canadian supermarket chain Loblaw Companies
 PC Mobile, a Canadian mobile virtual network operator
 PC Optimum, a Canadian rewards program
 President's Choice Financial, a Canadian financial services provider

Government bodies
 Peace Corps, a volunteer program run by the United States government
 Philippine Constabulary, a defunct police force
 Libyan Presidential Council
 Privy council, a body that advises the head of state of a nation
 King's Privy Council for Canada
 Privy Council of the United Kingdom

Political parties
 Colorado Party (disambiguation)
 Partido Comunista (disambiguation)
 Partidul Conservator, a Romanian conservative party
 Plaid Cymru, a Welsh nationalist political party
 Porozumienie Centrum, a now-defunct Polish right-wing political party
 Progressive Conservative Party of Canada, a defunct Canadian federal political party
 Progressive Canadian Party, a party made up of former members of the Progressive Conservative party
 Several current and former provincial political parties of Canada:
 Progressive Conservative Association of Alberta (1905–2017)
 Progressive Conservative Party of New Brunswick (1867– )
 Progressive Conservative Party of Newfoundland and Labrador (1949– )
 Progressive Conservative Association of Nova Scotia (1867– )
 Progressive Conservative Party of Ontario (1854– )
 Progressive Conservative Party of Prince Edward Island (1851– )
 Progressive Conservative Party of Quebec (1982–1989)
 Yukon Progressive Conservative Party (1978–1991)

Religious denominations
 Presbyterian Church
 Presbyterian Church (U.S.A.)

Schools
 ESPCI, an engineering school in France, also referred to as Physique-Chimie
 Pembroke College, Oxford, a constituent college of the University of Oxford
 Phoenix College, a community college in Arizona, US
 Pickering College, an independent, co-educational K-12 school in Newmarket, Ontario, Canada
 Port Charlotte High School, in Florida, US
 Port Credit Secondary School, in Mississauga, Ontario, Canada
 Presbyterian College, in Clinton, South Carolina, US
 Providence College, in Rhode Island, US
 Prempeh College, in Ashanti Region, Ghana

Law enforcement
 Police Constable, a police rank
 Protective custody, a type of imprisonment or care to protect a person from harm
 Probable cause, reasonable grounds (for making a search, pressing a charge, etc.)
 Police commissioner, the chief manager of a police entity
 Penal code, the legal code in some jurisdictions that define crimes

People
 PC (footballer) (born 1994), from Brazil 
 PC Chris, former professional Super Smash Bros. Melee player, named after Port Chester, New York
 Priyanka Chopra, an Indian actress, model and singer

Places

United States
 Park City, Utah
 Panama City, Florida
 Panorama City, Los Angeles, a district in the San Fernando Valley
 Port Charlotte, Florida
 Port Chester, New York

Other places
 Pacific Centre, a shopping mall in Vancouver, British Columbia, Canada
 Pacific Coast
 Pacific Islands Trust Territory (ISO 3166 country code)
 Panama City, the capital of Panama
 Pitcairn Islands (FIPS PUB 10-4 territory code)
 Port Credit, a neighbourhood of Mississauga, Ontario, Canada
 Serbia or the Republika Srpska, both of which can be abbreviated in Cyrillic to PC

Science, technology, and mathematics

Chemistry 
 Phosphatidylcholine, a phospholipid
 Polycarbonate, a plastic polymer
 Propylene carbonate, a polar organic solvent
 Pyruvate carboxylase, an enzyme

Computing
 Personal computer, a general-purpose computer for individuals
 IBM PC compatible, a ubiquitous personal computer architecture
 an IBM PC specifically running Microsoft Windows
 Programmable controller (disambiguation)
 Pica (typography) (pc), a typographic unit of measure
 Program counter, a special register inside CPUs

Mathematics
 Path connected, a concept in mathematical topology
 Precalculus, a level in math education
 Polynomial chaos, a concept in stochastic mathematics
 Principal component

Medicine and psychology

Anatomical structures
 Posterior commissure, a brain landmark commonly used in biomedical image processing
 Pubococcygeus muscle
 Parietal cell

Diseases
 Pachyonychia congenita, a genetic skin disorder
 Pancreatic cancer
 Prostate cancer

Other uses in medicine and psychology
 Palliative care, specialised care for people with serious illnesses
 Perceived control, a psychological concept
 Post cibum (Latin for "after food"), in medical prescriptions
 Primary care
 Phase contrast magnetic resonance imaging

Physics and cosmology
 Parsec (pc), a unit of distance used in astronomy
 Picocoulomb (pC), a unit of electrostatic charge
 Petacoulomb (PC), a unit of electrostatic charge
 Photonic crystal, a photonic band gap material

Other uses in science and technology
 PC, a type of Mazda C engine
 Prestressed concrete, a method for overcoming concrete's natural weakness in tension
 Progressive contextualization, a scientific method
 Prontor-Compur, a standard connector type for photographic flash synchronization

Transport
 Patrol craft, a small naval vessel generally designed for coastal defence duties
 Penn Central, a railroad in the United States
 Patrol, Coastal, a US Navy hull classification symbol
 PC-461-class submarine chaser
 Pegasus Airlines (IATA code: PC)

Other uses
 Political correctness, language or behavior that appears calculated to provide a minimum of offense
 President's Counsel, a lawyer's rank in Sri Lanka
 Pro-choice, the view that women should have the choice of whether or not to terminate a pregnancy
 Proto-Celtic, the reconstructed common ancestor of the Celtic languages

See also
 Piece (disambiguation)
 P.C. Hooftstraat, a street in Amsterdam, Netherlands
 Tandy Pocket Computer
 PCS (disambiguation)